(born November 25, 1957) is a retired professional baseball player and manager for the Hanshin Tigers of Nippon Professional Baseball .

In 1993, he was traded to the Orix BlueWave. He played there until . 

He managed the Hanshin Tigers from 2004 to 2008. He took charge again as manager of Hanshin ahead of the 2023 NPB season.

In November 2008, he entered into a contract with the Daily Sports Company as a commentator. In 2009, he appeared on Asahi Broadcasting Corporation (ABC, AM radio, Terrestrial TV), Sky A Sports Plus (SKY PerfecTV!, satellite TV) and other broadcasting stations in the Kansai region.

Okada returned to the field in 2010, managing the Orix Buffaloes from 2010 to 2012.

External links

 

1957 births
Living people
Baseball people from Osaka
Japanese baseball players
Nippon Professional Baseball infielders
Hanshin Tigers players
Orix BlueWave players
Nippon Professional Baseball Rookie of the Year Award winners
Managers of baseball teams in Japan
Hanshin Tigers managers
Orix Buffaloes managers